The Minister for Mental Wellbeing and Social Care is a member of the Scottish Government. The Minister reports to the Cabinet Secretary for Health and Sport, who has overall responsibility for the portfolio, and is a member of cabinet. As a Junior Minister the post holder is not a member of the Scottish Government Cabinet. The current Minister for Mental Wellbeing and Social Care is Kevin Stewart.

Overview 
Responsibilities include:
Mental health
Child and Adolescent Mental Health
Adult support and protection
Autism, sensory impairment and learning difficulties
Dementia
Mental Welfare Commission for Scotland (safeguards the rights of people with mental health problems, learning disabilities, dementia and related conditions)
Survivors of childhood abuse
The State Hospital at Carstairs

History
The Minister for Mental Health is the second Scottish Government ministerial post to include mental health in the title. The post had been announced on 21 November 2014 as the Minister for Sport and Health Improvement and similar ministerial posts had also existed in the very recent past under different titles. Mental health was added to the title so that the post became Minister for Sport, Health Improvement and Mental Health.

The Sport portfolio was the responsibility of Deputy Minister for Communities and Sport from 2000 to 2001 in the Dewar Government (which was not a cabinet position). From 2000 to 2001 the Minister for the Environment, Sport and Culture was the Cabinet Minister with whose responsibilities included sport. From 2001 to 2003 these roles were combined in the Minister for Communities and Sport, which was renamed the Minister for Tourism, Culture and Sport after the addition of the tourism portfolio, following the 2003 election.

The Salmond Government, elected following the Scottish Parliament election in 2007, created the junior post of Minister for Communities and Sport held by Stewart Maxwell MSP, combining the Sport and Communities portfolios.  The Minister assisted the new Cabinet Secretary for Health and Wellbeing.  In 2009, the Sport portfolio was given to the Minister for Public Health under the new title Minister for Public Health and Sport.  This post was held by Shona Robison.  After the 2011 Scottish election, sport was separated from the portfolio and given to a new Ministerial creation, the Minister for Commonwealth Games and Sport (this remained Shona Robison).

Finally, this was promoted to a Cabinet Secretary position from 22 April to 21 November 2014 under the title of Cabinet Secretary for Commonwealth Games, Sport, Equalities and Pensioners' Rights (still Shona Robison), until the reshuffle of 21 November 2014 when Nicola Sturgeon announced her first Cabinet.  Sport returned to its original position as a junior Ministerial post.

The current Minister for Mental Health post was created in the Second Sturgeon government in the reshuffle that followed the 2016 Scottish Parliament election.

List of office holders

See also
Scottish Parliament
Scottish Government

References

External links 
 Minister for Mental Health on Scottish Government website

Ministerial posts of the Scottish Government
Health in Scotland
Health ministers of Scotland